Chevrolet Musical Moments Revue, also known as Musical Moments or the Chevrolet Show, is an electrically transcribed or recorded radio program issued by World Broadcasting System.  It was a musical variety show which in 1935–36 featured David Rubinoff and Westbrook Van Voorhis (as "Hugh Conrad"), Monday through Friday for 15 minutes.  A great many musicians and musical ensembles appeared on this show including Gus Haenschen/Carl Fenton and his orchestra; the Song Smiths; Casper Reardon, jazz harpist; and Metropolitan Opera soprano Josephine Antoine in 1937.

In 1937, the program was broadcast on more than 400 stations, "the largest group of stations ever employed by any sponsored broadcast".

More than 155 recorded shows are known to exist in radio collections.

References

American music radio programs
1930s American radio programs